Ummed Sagar Bandh is a dam near Jodhpur in Rajasthan, India. It is located near Kaylana Lake. The dam supplies water to Jodhpur.

It was built during the reign of Maharaja Ummed Singh, in the year 1936.

List of lakes in India
List of lakes in India

References

Canals in Rajasthan
Jodhpur district
Dams completed in 1936
1936 establishments in India
20th-century architecture in India